The Tiga GT286 is a sports prototype race car, designed, developed, and built by British manufacturer Tiga, for sports car racing, conforming to Group C2 and IMSA GTP Lights rules and regulations, in 1986, and continued competing until 1993.

References

Sports prototypes
Group C cars
IMSA GTP cars